Isaac Oti-Bateng is an evangelist, pastor and teacher based in Accra, Ghana. He is the founder and presiding Bishop of Christ World Incorporated also known as Love Economy Church based in Ghana.

The Love Economy Church 
In 2011, Isaac Oti-Boateng began to pastor the Love Economy church in Kumasi. Love Economy Church is a thriving ministry with over forty branches and counting located all over the world. Isaac Oti-Boateng's mission is to help people discover the inherent power of God in them and to build a world where Christ is all and in All with Christ as the centre of the world.

References

Ghanaian Christians
Ghanaian clergy
Ghanaian religious leaders
Living people

Year of birth missing (living people)